Derek Evans may refer to:

 Derek Evans (EastEnders), a fictional character on the British soap opera EastEnders
 Derek Evans (Sunset Beach), a fictional character on the American soap opera Sunset Beach

See also
 Derrick Evans (disambiguation)